Guneh-ye Gameru (also Romanized as Gūneh-ye Gāmerū) is a village in Dalfard Rural District, Sarduiyeh District, Jiroft County, Kerman Province, Iran. At the 2006 census, its population was 20, in 5 families.

References 

Populated places in Jiroft County